Lavegahau is a village in Wallis and Futuna. It is located in Mua District on the east coast of Wallis Island. Its population according to the 2018 census was 330 people.

References

Populated places in Wallis and Futuna